The Arcis or Larcis (with article agglutination) is a river in Southwestern France. It is a  right tributary of the Léez, originating in the commune Luc-Armau in the east of the Pyrénées-Atlantiques. It joins the Léez in Lannux, in the French département of the Gers.

Name 
The name is documented as Arsiis (1540), Arciis (1542), Arcis (1863). The name of the Arcison, a left tributary of the Layon, is related.

Main tributaries 
 (L) Lizo, 
 (L) Léès, from Saubole.

References

Rivers of France
Rivers of Gers
Rivers of Pyrénées-Atlantiques
Rivers of Nouvelle-Aquitaine
Rivers of Occitania (administrative region)